Wraith is one of several traditional terms for a ghost or spirit. Wraith, Wraiths, or The Wraith may also refer to:

Fiction

Characters
 Wraith (G.I. Joe), a Cobra mercenary in G.I. Joe: America's Elite
 Wraith (Image Comics), a comic book superhero
 The Wraith (Slam Masters)
 The Wraith (Transformers)
 Wraith (Wild Cards)
 Wraith, a playable character in the game Apex Legends
 Wraith, a playable killer in the game Dead by Daylight
 Ringwraiths, or Nazgûl in Tolkien's legendarium

Marvel Comics
 Wraith (Hector Rendoza), a member of the X-Men
John Wraith, an X-Men supporting character who goes by the alias of Kestrel
 Wraith (Brian DeWolff), an adversary of Spider-Man
 Wraith (Zak-Del)
 Wraith (Yuri Watanabe), a rival and former ally of Spider-Man.
 Wraith (Amalgam Comics), an Amalgam Comics character from JLX

Races 
 Wraith (Dungeons & Dragons), a type of undead in Dungeons & Dragons
 Wraith, an alien race in Stargate Atlantis
 Wraith, a species in the Star Trek: Enterprise episode "Rogue Planet"
 Wraith, a type of monster in Evolve
 Wraith, a type of ghost in Phasmophobia (video game)

Vehicles
 Wraith Squadron, a starfighter squadron in the Star Wars universe
 Type-26 Assault Gun Carriage, Wraith, a plasma mortar tank used by the "Covenant" in Halo
 Wraith, a Terran air unit in StarCraft

Film
 The Wraith, a 1986 movie starring Charlie Sheen
 The Wraith (1957 film), an Australian television film

Music
 The Wraith: Shangri-La, a 2002 album by Insane Clown Posse
 The Wraith: Hell's Pit, a 2004 album by Insane Clown Posse
 The Wraith: Remix Albums, a dual album by Insane Clown Posse
 Wraith (song), a song by Peace from In Love
 "Wraith", a song by T.I. from his 2018 album Dime Trap
 Wraith, a song by Cephalic Carnage from Anomalies
 "The Wraith", an album by Toronto electronic music producer Roam

Vehicles
 Rolls-Royce Wraith (1938), an automobile built by Rolls-Royce from 1938 to 1939
 Rolls-Royce Wraith (2013), an automobile built by Rolls-Royce from 2013 to 2022
 B120 Wraith, a motorcycle built by the Confederate Motor Company

Other uses
 Wraith: The Oblivion, a role-playing game
 Wraith: Welcome to Christmasland, a comic book series by Joe Hill
 AMD Wraith, a line of CPU coolers
 Wraith Games, a video game developer
 Wraith, a frisbee used for disc golf. Produced by Innova Champion Discs

Surname 
 Geoffrey Wraith (1946–2019), English rugby league footballer
 Ronald Wraith (1908–?), British scholar
 Tom Wraith (1890–1970), Australian rules footballer and umpire

See also
 Ghosts in European culture
 List of comic characters named Wraith
 Wrath (disambiguation)
 Wreath